Governor Wentworth Historic Site is a  protected area in Wolfeboro, New Hampshire. The undeveloped property features a plaque and the stone remains of an extensive northern plantation built just before the outbreak of the American Revolution by New Hampshire's second Royal Governor, John Wentworth. The mansion burned to the ground in 1820. The site was acquired by the state in 1934, and was added to the New Hampshire State Register of Historic Places in 2007.

References

External links
Governor Wentworth Historic Site New Hampshire Department of Natural and Cultural Resources

State parks of New Hampshire
Parks in Carroll County, New Hampshire
Wolfeboro, New Hampshire
Buildings and structures completed in the 18th century
Buildings and structures demolished in 1820
Demolished buildings and structures in New Hampshire
Protected areas established in 1934
1934 establishments in New Hampshire